Cro-Mags are an American hardcore punk band from New York City. The band, which has a strong cult following, has released six studio albums, with the first two considered the most influential. With a Hare Krishna background, they were among the first bands to fuse hardcore punk with thrash metal.

Cro-Mags have gone through many line-up changes since the band's beginnings. Flanagan has been the sole trademark owner of the group's name since the early 1990s, the primary songwriter (a claim strongly denied by founding member Parris Mayhew in multiple recent interviews regarding the first three albums), and only member featured on every album, while Joseph and Jayson continued to tour with other musicians using the Cro-Mags name, against the wishes of Flanagan.

In April 2019, Flanagan reached a settlement with Joseph and Mackie Jayson in which Flanagan would retain exclusive rights to the Cro-Mags name while Joseph and Jayson would move forward under the name, Cro-Mags "JM".

History

Early years (1981–1985)
The band was formed under the name Mode of Ignorance, after Parris Mayhew had put up a number of posters in search of band members, which Harley Flanagan responded to. The band's original lineup consisted of Dave Hahn on drums, Mayhew and Dave Stein on guitar, John Joseph on lead vocals and Flanagan on bass. During its early existence, the band would go through frequent lineup changes, Mayhew explained in Tony Rettman's book New York Hardcore that this was because "Harley would see some kid with a shaved head and think 'This kid is hard... let's bring him into the band.' Then I would end up tolerating some horrible, talentless person for however long it took Harley to realise that the guy had no talent". Joseph left the band soon after to live in Puerto Rico and then Hawaii, and was replaced by Eric Casanova. One Cro-Mags lineup from this time consisted of Flanagan on drums, Mayhew on guitar, Todd Youth on bass and Casanova on vocals. By the time the band played their first live performance, Youth had been replaced by Roger Miret, however soon after Casanova was kicked out of the band due to the birth of his son interfering with scheduling. By this time, Joseph had returned to New York and so rejoined as the band's vocalist. Youth briefly re-joined the band after Miret's departure, at the same time Robb "Nunzio" Ortiz joined as an additional guitarist. A few months later, the band changed their name to the Cro-Mags.

Original run (1986–2002)
The band's debut album The Age of Quarrel was released in 1986, which was mostly written by Parris Mayhew and Flanagan, some songs being based on a four track demo that Flanagan had recorded solo in 1982 while on the West Coast. Joseph parted ways with the band again after The Age of Quarrel, leaving Flanagan to sing on the following Cro-Mags release, Best Wishes (1989), which had a more heavy metal-influenced sound. The next record Alpha Omega saw the return of Joseph singing along with Flanagan. According to cofounder Parris Mayhew, he wrote most of the album with guitarist Rob Buckley. However, neither Mayhew or Buckley played on the actual recording, and the writing has been disputed by Flanagan and others. Cro-Mags disbanded but later recorded the album with the return of Doug Holland and a new rhythm guitarist, Gabby Abularach.

The album, Near Death Experience was released in 1993, after which the group disbanded for several years. They began touring again in the late 1990s with Flanagan on vocals and bass and Mayhew returning to the fold. Eventually, the band released Revenge in 2000. For many fans, this album signified a return to Cro-Mags' early hardcore roots. Many songs were comparable to those on The Age of Quarrel, although some featured a more melodic/punk rock style. The release of Revenge and its subsequent tour resulted in yet another break up, which caused lasting resentment between Mayhew and Flanagan. In 2001 Flanagan asked Joseph to join him once again, but the short-lived reunion ended in 2002.

Reunion and legal battle over name ownership (2008–present)

In 2008, John Joseph and Jayson began playing shows under the Cro-Mags name with other established hardcore musicians such as Craig Setari from Sick of It All on bass and A.J. Novello from Leeway on guitar. In an October 2010 interview, Joseph revealed that they were planning to release a new album in 2011, though, ultimately, this did not happen. Flanagan released his solo debut album, Cro-Mags, in 2016, featuring Cro-Mags alumnus, Gabby Abularach, on guitar.

In 2018, Flanagan filed a federal trademark infringement against John Joseph and Mackie Jayson. In April 2019, Flanagan announced a settlement wherein he would own exclusive rights to the name Cro-Mags; simultaneously, Joseph announced his recognition of the settlement, and that he and his band would perform as Cro-Mags JM, beginning in August 2019. The lawsuit was settled in September 2022, with the rights to the Cro-Mags name belonging only to Flanagan.

On June 28, 2019, Cro-Mags released their first new music in nineteen years, sharing three new songs "Don't Give In", "Drag You Under", and "No One's Victim", and toured in North America and Europe.

Following the European tour, Cro-Mags released the digital single "From the Grave" that featured former Motörhead guitarist Phil Campbell on lead and slide guitar. A three-song 7-inch EP of the same name was released on December 6, 2019, in various colors and have the tracks "PTSD" and "Between Wars" included. The band was set to perform with Body Count in New York City on March 15 at Webster Hall. The show was postponed due to the COVID-19 virus. The band decided to live stream a free performance from SIR studios, one of the first bands to do so during the pandemic. On March 31, 2020, the band offered a free download of the track, "The Final Test" and announced the June 19 release date of their first studio album in twenty years, In the Beginning.

On September 2, the band premiered the video for "Between Wars", which features footage from the upcoming independent film of the same name starring Flanagan and The Sopranos star, Michael Imperioli, due to be released in 2020. As of July 2022, the film has not been released.

In July 2022, Flanagan announced that Cro-Mags have been working on new material for their next album.

Members

Current
 Harley Flanagan – bass (1981–1982, 1984–1996, 1999–2002, 2019–present); vocals (1982, 1987–1991, 1999–2002, 2019–present); drums (1982–1984); guitar (1982)
 Garry "G-Man" Sullivan – drums (1999–2001, 2002–2003, 2019–present)
 Hector Guzman – lead guitar (2022–present)
 Dom DiBenedetto – rhythm guitar (2022–present)

Former
 John Joseph - Vocals (1981-1982, 1984-1987, 1991-1999, 2002-2003, 2008-2019)
 Dave Hahn – drums (1981)
 Dave Stein – lead guitar (1981)
 Parris Mayhew – rhythm guitar (1981–1991, 1999–2001); lead guitar (1982–1984)
 Gabby Abularach – rhythm guitar (1991–1995, 2019–2020)
 Todd Youth – bass (1982–1983, 1984)
 Roger Miret – bass (1983–1984)
 Robb "Nunzio" Ortiz – lead guitar (1984)
 Mackie Jayson – drums (1984–1986, 1996–1999, 2008–2019)
 A.J. Novello – guitars (1993-1994, 2001-2002, 2008–2019)
 Craig Setari – bass (2008–2019)
 Eric Casanova – vocals (1982–1984)
 Doug Holland – lead guitar (1985–1989, 1991–1999, 2001); rhythm guitar (1995–1999, 2001)
 Pete Hines – drums (1986–1989)
 Dave di Censo – drums (1989–1995)
 Rob Buckley – lead guitar (1989–1991, 1993–1995, 2001); rhythm guitar (1993–1995, 2001)
 Rocky George – lead guitar (1999–2001, 2002–2003, 2019–2022); rhythm guitar (2002–2003)
 Joe Affe – rhythm guitar (2020–2022; touring 2019)

At various times during the 1990s and 2000s, Flanagan and Joseph simultaneously led separate versions of the Cro-Mags with completely different lineups. The groups billed themselves as Cro-Mag Jam, Street Justice, Age of Quarrel, FVK (Fearless Vampire Killers) or Cholo-Mags.

Timeline

Discography

Studio albums
 The Age of Quarrel (1986)
 Best Wishes (1989)
 Alpha Omega (1992)
 Near Death Experience (1993)
 Revenge (2000)
 In the Beginning (2020)

Singles and EPs
 Don't Give In (2019)
 From the Grave (2019)
 2020 (2020)

See also
 New York hardcore
 Animal rights and punk subculture

References

External links

 Official website
 
 Parris Mayhew's Cro-Mags website
 Interview with Quarter-Life Crisis
 Artist: Cro-Mags – MusicBrainz

1981 establishments in New York City
American thrash metal musical groups
Crossover thrash groups
Hardcore punk groups from New York (state)
Heavy metal musical groups from New York (state)
International Society for Krishna Consciousness bands
Musical groups established in 1981
Musical quartets
20th-century squatters
Demons Run Amok Entertainment artists